The Midlands Merit League was a summer rugby league tournament in England. In its final two years, it was known as the RL Merit League.

It was superseded by the Midlands Rugby League, North West Merit League and Yorkshire & Humber Merit League.

History

Background 

In 1895, several clubs in the North of England broke away from the Rugby Football Union (RFU), the governing body of rugby football in England, over the issue of player expenses.

This led to the great schism which resulted in rugby becoming two separate sports: rugby union administered by the RFU and rugby league administered by the Rugby Football League as the two games evolved different sets of rules.

Although rugby league spread overseas, sanctions by the RFU made it more difficult for the sport to expand beyond its "heartlands" in the traditional counties of Yorkshire, Lancashire and Cumberland.

Earlier non-heartland competitions and the Rugby League Conference

The Southern Conference League began as a 10-team pilot league in 1997 for team in the English Midlands and South of England following the collapse of various non-heartland leagues. A further major factor leading to the creation of the Conference was the fact that the professional clubs had switched to a summer season the previous year and thus interest in the sport in the winter was decreased. The abandonment of amateurism by the rival sport of rugby union in 1995 meant that it was now possible for rugby union players to play rugby league during their off-season without risking a ban from rugby union. This gave non-heartland clubs a larger player pool.

It was renamed the Rugby League Conference in 1998 and began to expand; by 2005 there were 90 teams from across England and Wales competing in the Conference.

Midlands Merit League and its successors
The Midlands Merit League was founded in late 2005 to support this growth in non-heartland areas. Originally intended as a stand-alone league, support from the Rugby Football League meant that it could be administered as part of the Rugby League Conference set-up. Interest quickly gathered with 13 teams showing an interest in participating in the inaugural season - 8 eventually participated. The first ever game took place on 8 April 2006 at All Saints Sports College, Sheffield, where the Sheffield Forgers beat the Chesterfield Spires by 58 points to 8.

The first cross-league fixture was played in June 2007 when Nottingham Outlaws Academy visited Northampton Casuals of the London League. They also played a return fixture in July.

The 2007 season saw the introduction of the Midlands Junior League as an informal under-15 league based on Merit League principles. In 2008 the junior competition featured under-14 and under-16 divisions.

The league was renamed Rugby League Merit League (RLML) for the 2008 season due to its increased geographical spread with teams from the North of England taking part. 2009 saw the largest ever entry, with over 30 teams split into two leagues; "Yorkshire and Humber" and "North West" with the Midlands Rugby League becoming its own competition using Merit League rules. A year later the Yorkshire & Humber Merit League and North West Merit League became competitions in their own right.

Season 2006

The 2006 competition operated on a merit table basis with teams organizing fixtures amongst themselves. The first fixtures were in April, with the final date for games to be included in the league table being Sunday 13 August.

The Grand Final for 2006 was held between the top two teams in the table on Sunday 13 August and took place a week later at Hillsborough Arena, home of the Sheffield Hillsborough Hawks. The final table (13 August) was as follows:

In the Grand Final South Humber Rabbitohs beat the Nottingham Outlaws by 42 points to 18 and became the inaugural champions.

Season 2007

The 2007 season followed the previous year's format, but 2007 also included play-offs and a Shield competition. The regular season closed at the end of July with the play-offs in August culminating in Finals day on 18 August.

The Grand Final for 2007 was held between St Helens Wild Boars and the German Exiles on Saturday 18 August at Dore Moor, home of the Sheffield Tigers Rugby Union Club and was won 46-22 by the Wild Boars. The inaugural Shield Final, on the same day, was between East Riding RLC and the Nottingham Outlaws Academy and was won by East Riding by 32–26. These teams came through the play-off system to reach the final.

The final table (29 July) was as follows:

Play-offs:

Championship semi-final

Sheffield Forgers 24-25 German Exiles

Shield

Chesterfield Spires 40-34 Barton Bulldogs

Nottingham Outlaws Academy 56-4 Shropshire Scorpions
East Riding RLC 64-6 Chesterfield Spires

FINALS:

St Helens Wild Boars 46-22 German Exiles

Shield: Nottingham Outlaws Academy 26-32 East Riding RLC

Season 2008

The Grand Final for 2008 was held on Sunday 17 August at The Sycamores, home of Leeds Akkies RLFC.

The final table (27 July) was as follows:

Play-offs:

Championship semi-finals

Moorends-Thorne Marauders 'A' 44 Sheffield Forgers 22

Nottingham Outlaws 'A' 4 Wigan Riversiders 48

Shield semi-finals

Nottingham 30 German Exiles 24

Sheffield 36 Birmingham Bulldogs 24

FINALS: Sunday 17 August 2008

GRAND FINAL: Moorends-Thorne Marauders 'A' 28 Wigan Riversiders 18

SHIELD: Nottingham Outlaws 34 Sheffield Forgers 32

Season 2009

2009 saw the largest ever entry, with over 30 teams split into two leagues; "Yorkshire and Humber" and "North West" with Midlands teams joining the newly created Midlands Rugby League.

The top four teams in the two pools played-off for the RL Merit League title.

(*) Parkside Hawks moved into the RLC North Midlands division after 1 game

North West final: Huyton Bulldogs 36-12 Wigan Riversiders Eels

Yorkshire and the Humber final: Upton RL 30-22 Victoria Rangers

Grand final: Upton RL 52-24 Huyton Bulldogs

External links
Midlands rugby league site

Rugby League Conference